Olga Fominichna Mizgireva (1908 – 1994) was a Turkmenistani painter and botanist.

Mizgireva was born in Tashkent in 1908. Her family stems from the village of Garrygala in southwest Turkmenistan. As a child, she exhibited interest in painting, and attended the experimental UShIV school for young talents in Ashgabat. Alexander Vladychik, the director of the school, would become her husband.  Her art was based on the traditional Turkmen motifs, painted in bright colors. Her paintings Heat, Turkmen girls, Creativity Carpet, and Four Wives are now on exhibit in the Turkmen Museum of Fine Arts.

In 1934, she received a commission for illustration of species collection of tulips by academician Nikolai Ivanovich Vavilov, on an order from the Netherlands. The work included several thousands of drawings. She returned to her home area of Garrygala, and started working as a laboratory technician in the Turkmenistan Research Station of the Federal Institute of Agriculture. She would remain there for her entire life. She took the duty of the director of the station in 1944, the position she would keep for her whole career, until the retirement in 1981. She spent many years to help establishment of a Zapovednik (national park) in the Kopet-Dag mountains, which was opened as the Sünt-Hasardag Nature Reserve park in 1973.

Mizgireva is credited with the 1938 discovery of Turkmen mandrake, Mandragora turcomanica, rare species of mandrake from the Kopet-Dag area.

References

Notes

External links
 Реликт. Из подлинных историй Русской Азии, Turkmenistan Chronicle 
 Paintings of Olga Mizgireva

1908 births
1994 deaths
Botanists with author abbreviations
Soviet botanists
20th-century botanists
Soviet painters
Artists from Tashkent
Turkmenistan women painters
Women botanists
Scientists from Tashkent
People from Syr-Darya Oblast
20th-century painters
20th-century women artists
20th-century women scientists
20th-century Turkmenistan women